Dogger Bank Wind Farm is a group of offshore wind farms under construction  off the east coast of Yorkshire, England in the North Sea. 
It was developed by the Forewind consortium, while three phases were envisioned - first phase (Creyke Beck A and B), second phase (Teesside A and B) and third phase (Teesside C and D). In 2015 the third phase was abandoned, while first and second phase was granted consent. It is expected that the Dogger Bank development will consist of four offshore wind farms, each with a capacity of up to 1.2 GW, creating a combined capacity of 4.8 GW.

Since 2017 Creyke Beck A and B and Teesside A are developed by Dogger Bank Wind Farm Limited as Dogger Bank A, B and C, while Teesside B is developed by Sofia Offshore Wind Farm Limited as Sofia Offshore Wind Farm. All four farms were successful in the 2019 contract for difference auction and have a delivery date between 2023 and 2025.

Project overview
It is one of nine offshore zones belonging to the Crown Estate which formed part of the third licence round for UK offshore wind farms.

The Dogger Bank is an attractive location for offshore wind farms because it is far away from shore, avoiding complaints about the visual impact of wind turbines, yet the water depth is shallow enough for traditional fixed foundation wind turbine designs.

The Forewind consortium was formed by the four owner companies – SSE, RWE, Statoil and Statkraft – in November 2008 in response to the third licence round. In January 2010, Forewind was announced as the developer for the Dogger Bank Zone, the largest of the Round 3 zones. Statoil increases its share from Statkraft, beginning in 2017. In August 2017 new ownership arrangements were announced, SSE and Equinor (formerly Statoil) have each taken 50% share in Dogger Bank Creyke Beck A, B and Teesside A, while Innogy (RWE subsidiary) has taken Teesside B and renamed it to Sofia Offshore Wind Farm. Originally projected to produce up to 9 GW of power, the plan was scaled down to 7.2 GW in 2014, and scaled down even further to 4.8 GW in 2015. Some of the steel used is from Port Talbot Steelworks.

In 2022 it was announced that the Dogger Bank A, B & C wind farms would be expanded to add an additional wind farm Dogger Bank D.  Additionally the Crown Estate leased out a 3GW zone named Dogger Bank South.

Wind Farm Project - Final Design and Construction
As of November 2022 there are four zones in the Dogger Bank Wind Farm project that are either in the pre-construction or full construction phase.  They are Dogger Bank A, B & C as well as Sophia.

Dogger Bank A and B

The first phase was called Dogger Bank Creyke Beck A and B. The original plan called for two offshore wind farms each generating up to 1.2 GW of electricity, with a total installed capacity of up to 2.4 GW. They would connect to the existing Creyke Beck substation near Cottingham, in the East Riding of Yorkshire. The two sites lie  from the East Yorkshire coast. Planning consent was granted for up to 400 turbines on 17 February 2015. These two projects were owned by SSE and Equinor, in December 2020 Eni acquired 20% stake. ABB was chosen for the HVDC power transfer cables to shore.

On 21 September 2020, it was announced that Dogger Bank A and B will use 190 GE Haliade-X 13 MW offshore wind turbines over both sites, meaning that 95 turbines will be used on each site. The availability of upgraded Haliade-X turbines rated at 13 MW rather than 12 MW means that each site will be capable of generating up to 1.235 GW, for a total of 2.47 GW. Turbines will be pre-assembled at Able Seaton Port in Hartlepool, an activity that will lead to the creation of 120 skilled jobs at the port during construction. Turbine installation is expected to commence in 2023 at Dogger Bank A. Power Purchase Agreements (PPA) for 15 years were signed in November 2020. Offshore cable laying started in April 2022. Installation of the turbine foundations was started in July 2022.

Dogger Bank C

Dogger Bank C will use GE Haliade 14 MW turbines. Installation of the turbines is set to begin in 2025 with completion of the overall project in 2026. Similar to Dogger Bank A&B, a 15-year Power Purchase Agreement was agreed in November 2021. All output (estimated at 18 TWh/year) from A, B and C were thus in contract, a stepping stone towards financing.

As a first for UK offshore wind, Dogger Bank C onshore converter station was among the winners of an auction to provide the cheapest options for reactive power to stabilize the grid and reduce grid cost. The converter will provide up to 200 megavolt amperes with a price of 0.34 £/MVAr/SP from April 2025 and ten years on.

Sofia
Sofia will use 100 Siemens Gamesa 14MW turbines. Offshore construction is set to begin in 2023 with completion of the overall project in 2026. 44 turbines use recyclable blades made in Hull.

Wind Farm Project - Additional Zones
Dogger Bank D

SSE Renewables and Equinor reviewing the potential to increase the size of the Dogger Bank Wind Farm, which is currently under construction.  This additional phase will be known as Dogger Bank D. The grid has the capability to support up to 1320MW.

Dogger Bank South

RWE is now moving forward with two new offshore wind farms in the Dogger Bank area.  Each will have a capacity of 1.5 GW generation.  Following the Round 4 leasing process, RWE obtained approval from the UK Secretary of State for Business, Energy and Industrial Strategy (BEIS) to enter into an Agreement for Lease with The Crown Estate in summer 2022. .

Dogger Bank Teesside
This section provides the historical context for the development of the Dogger Bank Wind Farm and the various name and design changes that have occurred since it was first proposed.

Dogger Bank Teesside were intended to be the second and third stage of development of the Dogger Bank Zone. It was divided into two phases of development: Dogger Bank Teesside A & B and Dogger Bank Teesside C & D. These would connect to the National Grid at a substation in Redcar & Cleveland, Teesside.

Dogger Bank Teesside A & B (Dogger Bank C and Sofia Offshore Wind Farm) 
Dogger Bank Teesside A & B comprised two wind farms, each generating up to 1.2 GW of electricity. Planning consent was granted for 400 turbines on 5 August 2015. Since 2017 SSE and Equinor own Dogger Bank Teesside A (renamed to Dogger Bank C), while Dogger Bank Teesside B was taken by Innogy and renamed Sofia Offshore Wind Farm.

Dogger Bank Teesside C & D 
This second application (C and D) was planned to comprise two wind farms, each generating up to 1.2 GW of electricity. It was originally expected that planning consent would be determined in 2017. However, in August 2015 Forewind scrapped the final phase and returned the remaining area of the Dogger Bank development zone to the Crown Estate.

North Sea Wind Power Hub
Dutch, German, and Danish electrical grid operators are cooperating in a project to build a North Sea Wind Power Hub complex on one or more artificial islands to be constructed on Dogger Bank as part of a European system for sustainable electricity. The power hub would interconnect the three national power grids with each other and with the Dogger Bank Wind Farm.

A study commissioned by Dutch electrical grid operator TenneT reported in February 2017 that as much as 110 gigawatts of wind energy generating capacity could ultimately be developed at the Dogger Bank location.

At the North Seas Energy Forum in Brussels on 23 March 2017, Energinet will sign a contract to work with the German and Dutch branches of TenneT; thereafter a feasibility study will be produced.

Battery storage
Adjacent to Creyke Beck substation for the wind farm, near Cottingham, the Pillswood 196 MWh battery storage power station was installed in 2022 using Tesla Megapack lithium-ion batteries, capable of producing 98 MW for 2 hours.

References

External links

National Infrastructure Planning

Equinor
Offshore wind farms in the North Sea
Proposed wind farms in England
Round 3 offshore wind farms
RWE
SSE plc
Statkraft
Nationally Significant Infrastructure Projects (United Kingdom)